Eric Weissel Oval was a multi-use stadium in Wagga Wagga, New South Wales, Australia. It was named after local rugby league footballer Eric Weissel and opened in 1959.  It was used mostly for rugby league matches and had a capacity of 10,000 people, with a record crowd of 11,685 recorded on 20 July 1988 for the Australia vs Papua New Guinea as part of the 1985 - 1988 Rugby League World Cup where the Aussies defeated the Kumuls by a then world record score of 70–8. The oval has hosted City vs Country (ARL), National Rugby League premiership and trial games, Brumbies vs Waikato Chiefs (Rugby union).

Name
The oval was named after Eric Weissel a state and national representative rugby league five-eighth who played in the 1920s and 1930s. In spite of representative honours and the allure of the Sydney first grade competition Weissel played his entire club football career in the Riverina with five different clubs including Wagga Wagga.

Closure and redevelopment
In June 2004 the owners of the oval, Wagga Wagga Leagues Club went into receivership, however the oval remained open up until 2007. In 2005 Wagga Wagga Leagues Club, Eric Weissel Oval and Allen Staunton Oval were sold to developers. The oval was rezoned from private recreation to residential by the Wagga Wagga City Council on 26 September 2005. In December 2008 the owners of the site, McIntyre Nash Pty Ltd, lodged an application to demolish which includes the removal of fencing, grandstand, change rooms and a broadcast box.
The Oval was demolished in 2015 by McIntyre Nash along with the neighbouring leagues club, and the housing development is due to start in 2016.

NRL Matches

Gallery

See also

List of sports venues named after individuals

References

External links

Rugby league stadiums in Australia
Rugby League World Cup stadiums
Sport in Wagga Wagga
Sports venues in New South Wales
1959 establishments in Australia
Sports venues completed in 1959